The 1894–95 Scottish Division One season was won by Heart of Midlothian by five points over nearest rival Celtic.

League table

Results

References 

1894–95 Scottish Football League
Scottish Division One seasons